Timothy Daniel Pool (born March 9, 1986) is an American YouTuber, political commentator and podcast host who first became known for live streaming the 2011 Occupy Wall Street protests. He joined Vice Media and Fusion TV in 2014, later working alone on YouTube and other platforms.

Early life
Pool was born in Chicago, Illinois, and grew up in a middle-class family. His father was a firefighter and his mother sold cars. Pool attended a Catholic school until completing the fifth grade and left school at the age of 14.

Career

Occupy
After watching a viral video from Occupy Wall Street, Pool purchased a one-way bus ticket to New York. Pool joined the Occupy Wall Street protestors on September 20, 2011, and met Henry Ferry, a former realtor and sales manager, shortly afterwards, and they formed a media company called The Other 99. Pool also began livestreaming the protests with his cell phone and quickly assumed an on-camera role. Pool used a live-chat stream to respond to questions from viewers while reporting on Occupy Wall Street. Pool also let his viewers direct him on where to shoot footage. He modified a toy remote-controlled Parrot AR.Drone for aerial surveillance and modified software for live streaming into a system called DroneStream. In mid-November 2011, Pool provided non-stop 21 hour coverage of Occupy Wall Street's eviction from Zuccotti Park. Pool's use of live streaming video and aerial drones during Occupy Wall Street protests in 2011 led to an article in The Guardian querying whether such activities could take the form of counterproductive surveillance. In January 2012, he was physically accosted by a masked assailant. Also in January 2012, The Other 99 was disbanded following a feud between Pool and Ferry. Pool had also planned on livestreaming occupy protests across the United States for a documentary called Occumentary, but it was never filmed.

Pool's video taken during the protests was instrumental evidence in the acquittal of photographer Alexander Arbuckle, who had been arrested by the NYPD. The video showed that the arresting officer lied under oath, though no charges were filed. While covering the NoNATO protests at the 2012 Chicago summit, Pool and four others were pulled over by a dozen Chicago police officers in unmarked vehicles. The group was removed from the vehicle at gunpoint, questioned, and detained for ten minutes. The reason given by police was that the team's vehicle matched a description.

In the context of the Occupy movement, Pool's footage was aired on NBC and other mainstream networks. According to The Washington Post, Pool "helped demonstrate to activists that livestreaming had potential as an alternative to depending on cable news coverage". He was nominated as a Time 100 personality in March 2012 for his importance to the Occupy movement, alongside David Graeber, as Time dubbed Pool "the eyes of the movement".

In November 2011, Pool told On the Media, "I don't consider myself a journalist." "I consider myself an activist 100%." there "to support the movement." In October 2012, he told El País that "I'm not an activist" and described himself as a journalist. In 2018, Pool said that "I don't align with Occupy Wall Street and never did". In 2021, he denounced the Occupy movement as "crooked".

Vice and Fusion

After joining Vice Media, Pool began producing and hosting content and developed new methods of reporting. In 2013, he reported on the Gezi Park protests in Istanbul with Google Glass. In April 2013, Pool received a Shorty Award in the "Best Journalist in Social Media" category. From 2013 to 2014, while working for Vice, Pool covered and live streamed the mass protests in Ukraine that led to the collapse of the Yanukovych government. He also covered the Ferguson unrest and covered protests in Thailand, Turkey, and Egypt.

In 2014, he joined Fusion TV as Director of Media innovation and Senior Correspondent.

Independent work
As of 2021, Pool operates six YouTube channels, two of which, Timcast and Tim Pool, feature daily political commentary, while a third serves as a clip channel for Pool's podcast, Timcast IRL.

In May 2022, it was estimated that Timcast IRL generated $65,824.86 in non-advertising revenue for YouTube across 100 videos on the Timcast IRL channel from October 2020 to November 2021.

Journalism and commentary
Pool covered the 2016 Milwaukee riots. Pool said he would leave the area and stop reporting on these events, saying he thought it was dangerous due to perceived escalating "racial tensions".

In February 2017, Pool traveled to Sweden to investigate claims of "no-go zones" and problems with refugees in the country. He launched a crowdfunding effort to do so after U.S. president Donald Trump alluded to crimes related to immigration in Sweden. InfoWars writer Paul Joseph Watson offered to pay for travel costs and accommodation for any reporter "to stay in crime-ridden migrant suburbs of Malmö." Watson donated $2,000 to Pool's crowdfund to travel to Sweden. While in Sweden, Pool largely disputed that migrant suburbs of Malmö and Stockholm were crime ridden, saying that Chicago is vastly more violent. While filming in Rinkeby, a Stockholm suburb, Pool alleged that he had to be escorted by police, due to purported threats to his safety. Swedish police have disputed Pool's claims, stating, "Our understanding is that he didn't receive an escort. However, he followed the police who left the place." The police stated that, "When Tim Pool took out a camera and started filming, a group of young people pulled their hoods up and covered their faces and shouted at him to stop filming. The officers then told Tim Pool that it was not wise to stay there in the middle of the square and keep filming."

In November 2017, Pool created his second YouTube channel, Timcast News.

In 2019, podcaster Joe Rogan invited Pool onto his podcast, The Joe Rogan Experience, following an interview with Twitter founder Jack Dorsey. The two criticized the banning of Milo Yiannopoulos from Twitter, arguing that the provocateur had not truly encouraged his fans to harass Ghostbusters actress Leslie Jones. The Atlantic contributor Devin Gordon criticized Rogan and Pool, stating that both men demonstrated a limited understanding of Twitter, censorship, and abuse during the discussion. Rogan invited Pool and Dorsey, as well as Twitter chief legal officer Vijaya Gadde, back on his podcast. Pool described cases where he asserted conservatives were unfairly suspended on Twitter. In particular, Pool brought up the banning of Alex Jones and argued that Twitter rules against misgendering transgender users is ideological. Gadde said that Twitter is a free speech platform on which punishments are based on evaluation of consistently-applied harassment guidelines.

In July 2019, Pool participated in a White House event hosting internet personalities who President Trump characterized as unfairly targeted for their conservative views.
	
In August 2020, Trump liked a tweet published by Pool expressing sympathy and support for Kyle Rittenhouse, a 17-year-old boy from Antioch, Illinois then facing trial on charges of killing two people during the riots in Kenosha, Wisconsin for which he was ultimately acquitted. Trump's son, Donald Trump Jr., retweeted a statement by Pool describing how the case of Rittenhouse had convinced Pool to vote for Trump.

A report from the Election Integrity Partnership (EIP) said that Pool was a "superspreader" of claims surrounding voter fraud before and after the 2020 United States presidential election.

In August 2021, Pool criticized New York City Mayor Bill de Blasio's COVID-19 vaccine passport mandate, as it did not have any exemptions for immunocompromised people or people with other disabilities.

In April 2022, Pool and The Daily Wire CEO Jeremy Boreing purchased a billboard in Times Square to accuse Taylor Lorenz of doxxing the Twitter account Libs of TikTok. In response, Lorenz called the billboard "so idiotic it's hilarious".

In July 2022, Pool had an op-ed published in Newsweek magazine in response to video footage of him being included in the United States House Select Committee on the January 6 Attack public hearings. Pool claimed the committee misrepresented him with an out of context clip of him reading a Fox News news article alongside people calling for a "red wedding".

In November 2022, Pool interviewed rapper and presidential candidate Kanye West. West's political advisors, alt-right commentator Milo Yiannopoulos and white supremacist Nick Fuentes also participated in the interview. The interview came days after West and Fuentes met with former President Trump. During the interview, West made a series of antisemitic statements, including claims about a Jewish conspiracy controlling the American government and media. Pool criticized West's comments on Jews, saying "I'm gonna disagree with you." After Pool refused to explicitly criticize Jews, West and his advisors walked out of the interview.

As of 2019 and 2020, Pool's audience was largely right-wing.

Other activities
In 2014, Pool helped launch Tagg.ly, a mobile app that watermarks photos. Pool said he was interested in this kind of application due to experiences where others used his photographs without attribution.

In 2019, he co-founded the news company Subverse, which raised $1 million in 22 hours via regulation crowdfunding in 2019, surpassing the previous record on Wefunder. The service was later renamed SCNR. Pool partnered with Emily Molli and former Vice editor-in-chief Rocco Castoro, although Pool later fired both of them in January 2021.

In 2022, he collaborated with drummer Pete Parada to release a single called "Only Ever Wanted", which reached the No. 2 spot on the global Apple Music chart. The single was most downloaded on the Billboard charts in September 2022 in Alternative Digital Song Sales.

"Genocide (Losing My Mind)" reached the No. 2 spot on Billboard'''s Rock Digital Song No. 1 song chart for All Genres on iTunes in November 2022. The song competed with Taylor Swift's "Anti-Hero" for the No. 1 spot on iTunes. By December 2022, the single had sold 13,000 singles and been streamed over 1 million times. 

 Singles 

 Views 

In 2019, Vice, Pool's former employer, described him in separate articles as "lefty" and "progressive" for his anti-corporate politics, as well as "right-wing". In 2019, Pool described himself as a social liberal who supports Bernie Sanders. According to Politico'', Pool's "views on issues including social media bias and immigration often align with conservatives". According to Al Jazeera, "Pool has amplified claims that conservative media endure persecution and bias at the hands of tech companies." Prior to Occupy Wall Street, Pool sometimes described himself as being anti-authoritarian or "pro-transparency", but did not think of himself as being very political.

On August 24, 2020, Pool announced his support for Donald Trump in the 2020 U.S. presidential election, writing that he felt alienated by changes he perceived in the modern left. In 2021, the Southern Poverty Law Center (SPLC) described Pool as a "reactionary". On July 12, 2022, the United States House Select Committee on the January 6 Attack included clips of a 2020 video from Pool as part of a montage of videos showing support for Trump's announced rally on January 6.

Pool tends to reject a left/right political framework for both self-description and in other contexts, instead preferring to divide the public into those who are "discerning" and "skeptical regarding legacy media" and those who are "undiscerning" and "uninitiated". He often discusses his impression that "the news is dying" and that it tends to skew towards liberal and left-leaning audiences as a result.

Personal life
Prior to the Occupy movement, Pool lived with his brother in Newport News, Virginia, where he played guitar and made skateboarding videos.

References

External links

 
 
 
 

1986 births
Living people
American male journalists
American political commentators
American YouTubers
American media critics
American podcasters
Commentary YouTubers
Music YouTubers
News YouTubers
Lifestyle YouTubers
Occupy Wall Street
People from New Jersey
Writers from Chicago
YouTube channels launched in 2012
21st-century American journalists
YouTube podcasters
YouTube vloggers